2014: The Election that Changed India is a 2015 book by Rajdeep Sardesai, a writer and journalist.
 
In his  book, Sardesai tells the story of the 2014 Indian general election. It was released on 1 November 2014. The book follows through the major stories of the 2014 Loksabha elections which affected the fate of Narendra Modi, Manmohan Singh and Rahul Gandhi.

It was the first time since 1984 that a party had won enough seats to govern without the support of other parties.

As per the requirements of the Indian Constitution, elections to the Lok Sabha must be held at an interval of five years or whenever parliament is dissolved by the president. The previous election, to the 15th Lok Sabha, was conducted in April–May 2009, and its term would have naturally expired on 31 May 2014.

Reception

In the Deccan Chronicle Suparna Sharma wrote that "Rajdeep Sardesai gives us almost a fly-on-the-wall account of the campaign of one party" and "With broad, confident brushstrokes he creates, in true kshatriya tradition, character sketches, post-script of course, of Modi the winner and Rahul the loser. He analyses and judges personalities by what they did on the battlefield, no so much by who they are, or what they stand for".

In Daily News and Analysis the book is described as a "must-read for all news junkies" but criticised that the title of the book itself is never justified and was only a "a big bang title to grab eyeballs".

References

Books about politics of India
Non-fiction books about elections
Penguin Books India books
21st-century Indian books
2015 non-fiction books
Books about Narendra Modi
2014 Indian general election